Caesar: Let the Dice Fly is the fifth historical novel in Colleen McCullough's Masters of Rome series.

Plot summary
The novel opens in 54 BC, with Caesar in the middle of his epochal Gallic campaigns, having just invaded Britannia. The first half of the novel deals broadly with the conclusion of his conquests in Gaul, and the second half narrates the growing sense of unease in Rome concerning Caesar's intentions, the antagonism of the conservative 'boni' faction towards him, his crossing of the Rubicon, his invasion of Italy and his victory in the Civil War.

Some of the pivotal moments include Caesar's return from Britannia; his narrow escape during the battle of Gergovia; his great victory at Alesia, which involved the complete circumvallation of the citadel, the repulse of a relief force, and the acceptance of the surrender of Vercingetorix; his final destruction of the Gallic resistance at Uxellodunum; the death of Julia and Marcus Licinius Crassus; his falling out with Gnaeus Pompeius Magnus and the final collapse of the First Triumvirate system; his failed negotiations concerning his re-election as consul; the opening of the Civil War; the Battle of Dyrrhachium and the Battle of Pharsalus; the flight of Pompey to Ptolemaic Egypt and his assassination there; and the scattering of the 'boni' leadership.

Reception 
Kirkus reviews noted that the book was dense for the average reader, but enjoyable for the "armchair general."

References

1997 Australian novels
Masters of Rome series
Novels set in the 1st century BC
Fictional depictions of Julius Caesar in literature
Cultural depictions of Marcus Junius Brutus
Cultural depictions of Pompey
Cultural depictions of Marcus Licinius Crassus
Cultural depictions of Vercingetorix
William Morrow and Company books